Women of Providence in Collaboration or WPC is an association of congregations of North American Roman Catholic religious sisters with "Providence" in their name. It initially grew out of an idea by Sister Michelle Holland, SP (Spokane, Washington), to have an event for religious congregations to come together with the purpose of "exploring together the theology and spirituality of Providence." This event occurred in 1980 in Great Falls, Montana, and 80 sisters from varying congregations attended.

In 1982 another event occurred, from which a Women of Providence in Collaboration steering committee was formed. This committee included Michelle Holland, SP of Spokane; Barbara Doherty, SP of Saint Mary-of-the-Woods; Kathleen Popko, SP of Holyoke; Mary Joan Coultas, CDP of Pittsburgh; and Anita Green, CDP of St. Louis.

Since 1982, the congregations have continued meeting and hosting events for their congregation members. These members are:

 Congregation of Divine Providence, San Antonio, Texas
 Congregation of the Sisters of Divine Providence, Wakefield, Rhode Island
 Missionary Catechists of Divine Providence, San Antonio, Texas
 Oblate Sisters of Providence, Baltimore
 Sisters of Providence, Montreal Quebec
 Sisters of Providence of Holyoke, Massachusetts
 Sisters of Providence of Saint Mary-of-the-Woods, Indiana
 Sisters of Providence of St. Vincent de Paul, Kingston, Ontario

The current executive director is Sister Ann Margaret O'Hara, SP, member of the Sisters of Providence of Saint Mary-of-the-Woods

References

External links
 WPC Congregational "Tree" - shows the history of the member congregations and formation relationships

Christian organizations established in 1980
Christian organizations established in 1982
1980 establishments in Montana